Ritesh Pandey (born 3 April 1981) is an Indian politician serving as the Member of Parliament from Ambedkar Nagar constituency. He is a member of the Bahujan Samaj Party (BSP) from the state of Uttar Pradesh. He was also a MLA from Jalalpur constituency in Ambedkar Nagar district, which he represented between June 2017 and May 2019 before elected as MP in (Lok Sabha). He was appointed the Leader of the BSP in the Lok Sabha in January 2020. Prior to this appointment, he served as the Deputy Leader.

Personal life 
Pandey was born in Lucknow on 3 April 1981 to politician Rakesh Pandey and Manju Pandey. His father is a former Member of Parliament from Ambedkar Nagar. His older brother, Ashish Pandey is a real estate businessman. He graduated with a bachelor's degree in international business management from the European Business School in London in the year 2005.

Politics 
In the 2019 Indian Parliamentary Elections, Pandey won the Lok Sabha polls from Ambedkar Nagar by defeating his closest rival from the BJP, Mukut Bihari, with a winning margin of 95880 votes. In the assembly elections of 2017, he was elected as a MLA from the Jalalpur constituency, with a victory margin of 90303 votes. In 2012, Pandey unsuccessfully contested the Uttar Pradesh assembly elections, losing to Sher Bahadur Singh from the Samajwadi Party. Pandey has been ranked 19th in the Parliamentary Business Survey among 539 MPs in the country. He is the youngest MP to appear in the Top-20. Pandey has also got an excellent grade for the expenditure incurred on development works. He also serves as Chairman of the Parliamentary Committee on Papers Laid on the Table of the House. In 2020, he became the Floor Leader of the Bahujan Samaj Party in the Lok Sabha, becoming one of the youngest parliamentarians to lead a major national party in Parliament. Pandey is also an active member of multiple parliamentary committees such as the Standing Committee on External Affairs, the Joint Parliamentary Committee to examine the Personal Data Protection Bill, 2019 and the Joint Parliamentary Committee on the Biological Diversity (Amendment) Bill 2021.

Social work 
Pandey is the chairman of the Raghuraji Devi Foundation Trust who works on reforming education and promoting youth cultural events. He is also the co-founder and CEO of Awadh Mutineers, a grassroots sports initiative that trains and supports underprivileged children for playing football.

References 

1981 births
Living people
India MPs 2019–present
Uttar Pradesh MLAs 2017–2022
Alumni of European Business School London
Politicians from Lucknow
Bahujan Samaj Party politicians from Uttar Pradesh